Sudhansu Kumar Das (born 3 September 1898) or S. K. Das was an Indian bureaucrat and Acting Chief Justice of the Supreme Court of India.

Early life
Das completed his schooling from Krishnagar Collegiate School, Krishnanagar, Nadia. He passed B.A. (Hons.) from the Presidency College and studied in the University of London. In 1921, he qualified for Indian Civil Service by the open competitive examination and joined in the Indian administration.

Career
Das worked in Bihar and Orissa as Assistant Magistrate and Collector, thereafter served as District and Sessions Judge. He was Registrar of the Patna High Court. Das also became the Secretary, Legislative Department, Judicial Secretary and Legal Remembrancer and Labour Commissioner under the Bihar Government. In 1944 he was appointed officiating Judge of the Patna High Court and became the Additional Judge in 1945. He served as Permanent Judge of the same High Court since 1948 to 1955. Das was elevated to the post of Chief Justice of the High Court in January 1955. He was promoted to the Judge of the Supreme Court of India on 30 April 1956 and served as acting Chief Justice from August, 1963. This period was described as Das Court.  He inherited a court composed of 10 permanent judges, including himself. During this period Justice Das increased the strength of the Court, changed many personnel and tried to reform the infrastructures.

References

1898 births
Year of death missing
Justices of the Supreme Court of India
Chief Justices of the Patna High Court
Presidency University, Kolkata alumni
University of Calcutta alumni
Alumni of the University of London
20th-century Bengalis
People from Krishnagar
Indian civil servants
Indian Civil Service (British India) officers